Sarla Ek Koti is a 2023 Indian Marathi-language drama film directed by Nitin Sindhuvijay Supekar and produced by Sanvi Production House. The film stars Onkar Bhojne, Chhaya Kadam, Isha Keskar in lead roles. It was theatrically released on 20 January 2023.

Cast

Lead 

 Onkar Bhojne as Bhikaji Vakhre
 Isha Keskar as Sarla
 Chhaya Kadam Bhikaji's mother
 Kamlakar Satpute
 Ramesh Pardeshi
 Vanita Kharat
 Suresh Vishwakarma

Supporting cast 

 Vijay Nikam
 Abhijeet Chavan
 Yashpal Sarnath
 Jatin Inamdar
 Mahendra Khilare
 Ramakant Bhalerao 
 Kapil Kamble
 Shyam Mate
 Shubham Khare 
 Yogesh Iratkar
 Abhilasha Paul

Soundtrack 

Music and background score is by Vijay Narayan Gavande and the lyrics is by Guru Thakur. Songs are recorded by Ajay Gogawale, Aarya Ambekar, Vaishali Bhaisane Made and Sayli Khare.

Release 
Sarla Ek Koti was theatrically released on 20 January 2023 in Maharashtra.

Reception

Critical reception 
Sacnilk gave 6.4 out of 10 based on 25 user rating. Anub George of Times of India rated 3.5 out of 5 and praised storytelling and intersting situations clearly written in the film and wrote ''The peak moment for this film is the way the narrative turns a 180 at the end. The sheer joy that the twist brings makes Sarla Ek Koti worth a watch.'' Saurav Mahind of Urbanly Pune gave 2 stars out of 5 and appreciated a very technically sound use, organic chemistry of Isha and Onkar and background music. Criticised to supporting actors poor comic timing and the story deviates from its main plot so the film feels too long and not compelling enough.

References

External links 
 

2023 films
Indian romantic drama films
Indian comedy films
Indian comedy-drama films
Indian drama films